Jolanta (Jola) Wesolowska-Mantilla (born 11 November 1958) is a former Polish competitive figure skater. Wesolowska is a multiple-time Polish National Champion in Ice Dancing (ice dancing with Andrzej Alberciak, 1978, 1979, 1980, 1982), and represented Poland at the 1978 European Figure Skating Championships.

Personal life
Jola Wesolowska was born in Lodz, Poland, and attended the Lodz Technical University, where she graduated with a master's degree in organic chemistry  After concluding her competitive career, she moved with her family to the United States.

She currently resides in Illinois where she coaches aspiring figure skaters in the Chicago area.

References

Polish female ice dancers
1958 births
Living people
Sportspeople from Łódź